The Men's omnium at the 2012 UCI Track Cycling World Championships was held on April 5–6. 24 athletes participated in the contest.

Medalists

Individual Event Results

Flying Lap
The race was held at 16:35.

Points Race
The race was held at 19:45.

Elimination Race
The race was held at 23:00.

Individual Pursuit
The race was held at 15:00.

Scratch Race
The race was held at 19:50.

1 km Time Trial
The race was held at 21:45.

Standings 
Final results.

References

2012 UCI Track Cycling World Championships
UCI Track Cycling World Championships – Men's omnium